The 1940–41 season was Stoke City's sixth season in the non-competitive War League.

In 1939 World War II was declared and the Football League was cancelled. In its place were formed War Leagues and cups, based on geographical lines rather than based on previous league placement. However, none of these were considered to be competitive football, and thus their records are not recognised by the Football League and thus not included in official records.

Season review
With so many players unable to get leave from the army on matchdays this gave the club a perfect opportunity to field several younger players and when Stoke kicked off the 1940–41 season against Notts County on 31 August 1940 they fielded a side with an average age of 21. Several clubs did not play as many matches as others during the season and Stoke, well below strength and lacking in form, conceded a remarkable 23 goals in just four games in December and January.

Stoke's back line caved in regularly and seven goals were put past them on three occasions at Mansfield, Northampton and Walsall. Stoke finished 25th (out of 34) in the final South Regional League this season when a points average decided league placings rather than points simply because some teams did not play as many games as others e.g. Birmingham played 16 and Stoke 36.

Final league table
 Note: Due to the inconsistent number of matches played by teams in 1940–41, positions were decided by goal-average.

Results

Stoke's score comes first

Legend

War League South Regional Championship

Football League War Cup

Friendlies

Squad statistics

References

Stoke City F.C. seasons
Stoke City